Sugarcoat may refer to:

Music
Sugarcoating, album by Martin Sexton
Sugarcoat, EP by Finabah
"Sugarcoat" (Jaira Burns song)
"Sugarcoat" (George Ezra song)
"Sugarcoat", song by Breaking Benjamin from We Are Not Alone (Breaking Benjamin album)
"Sugarcoat", song by War from a Harlots Mouth from MMX (War from a Harlots Mouth album)
"Sugarcoat", song by Rustic Overtones Rooms by the Hour 1998  
"Sugarcoat", song by Jason Ward from Almighty Row 2009

Other
Sugarcoat, a character in My Little Pony: Equestria Girls